BONZIE (born Nina Ferraro) is an American singer-songwriter and musician based in Chicago, Illinois. She has been compared to a "young Chan Marshall," and described as a  "wunderkind" by Spin magazine. BONZIE has performed nationwide, including a show at SXSW described by The New York Times as "riveting".

History 

In the year 2010 at age 15, BONZIE released her debut EP, The Promise, as Nina Ferraro, and began using the stage name BONZIE shortly thereafter.  In a 2013 interview with the Chicago Tribune, she explained her decision.  "There was something about it that felt egotistical to me, and music was never that sort of pursuit. BONZIE feels a lot better to go under, not only because it's a pseudonym, but also because it doesn't subscribe to a language. There isn't a conventional definition of BONZIE, and it's more something where I can become its meaning."

BONZIE wrote and co-produced her first full-length album, Rift into The Secret Of Things, which was released in August 2013 at age 17. It was preceded by the single "Data Blockers," which premiered on Spin.com, It was followed by a second single "Felix," which features The Milk Carton Kids' Joey Ryan and Kenneth Pattengale. The album's title was inspired by a passage from Henry David Thoreau's Walden.

In 2016, BONZIE released a double single, "As The Surface Rose" via Under The Radar, who said it "conjures an emotive vacuum where BONZIE's voice and piano keys hover and haunt."

The New York Times featured the music video for "As The Surface Rose" shortly after its release, where chief music critic Jon Pareles writes, "This song is an ambitious interlude, a statement of commitment... A guy in a skinny tie pursues her, rowing into a storm. He has a film camera, she wears a glittery dress. There are no bubbles as she breathes underwater, but she tells her story. "You won't let go," she sings."

This was soon followed by another double single, entitled "How Do You Find Yourself, Love?," a 7" vinyl that premiered on BrooklynVegan.  It is described as a companion piece to "As The Surface Rose."

The live-to-track, "How Do You Find Yourself, Love?," was recorded by Steve Albini, and includes instrumental B-side "Back to an Insurmountable wall", which was produced and performed by BONZIE, and recorded by Tortoise member John McEntire. "As The Surface Rose" was backed by a lyric-free B-side,"Half Full."
 
She has opened for Iron & Wine and toured with Cayucas.

BONZIE released the second full-length album called Zone on Nine in May 2017. The album was fully written and produced by Ferraro herself, and co-produced with Jonathan Wilson (Father John Misty, Conor Oberst) and Ali Chant (Perfume Genius, Youth Lagoon).

The album was released to critical acclaim, namely two front-page articles in the Chicago Tribune by the top music critic Greg Kot who called Zone on Nine "Stunning".  Kot also wrote "BONZIE has shown a consistent refusal to be pinned down to a genre or simplified descriptions of the kind of music she makes."

Other reviews for Zone on Nine included VICE who wrote "Her intricately layered music taps into personal connections — the relationship you have with yourself, the connection between the body and the mind... [it has a] gorgeous sonic palette that's hard to pinpoint but instantly alluring".

Paste Magazine wrote about the album ""The way certain notes bend on the Chicago songwriter's latest tune only draw you in closer as you wonder 'What's that sound?'".

A music video for the song "Crescent" shortly followed, featuring BONZIE nude in bodypaint depicting an AI investigating the mind.

In September 2020, BONZIE released a single and animated music video for a song entitled "alone".  It was written by BONZIE and co-produced with DJ Camper.  NPR's All Songs Considered premiered the track, writing "brilliantly talented.  The atmospherics in this song are stunning."  In the All Songs Considered podcast, NPR's Bob Boilen also announced a forthcoming full length album.  The music video for "alone" was animated by Japanese hand-paint artist Miyo Sato and won a number of international film festival awards.  The New York Times also wrote about the song remarking that "the isolation is palpable," and named it one of the Best Songs of 2020.

The third full-length album entitled Reincarnation was released in March 2021.  In a feature long-form article in The New York Times, Jon Pareles wrote "It would be the continuation of a fully independent career that has consistently yielded richly melodic and mysterious songs."  Pareles reviewed the album and included portions of an interview with BONZIE, as well as Steve Albini, who said "I was impressed by her drive and her seriousness at a very early age".  The article appeared in print in the Arts section of The New York Times.

Discography 

Reincarnation, Album, 2021
"Lethal," single, 2020
"alone," single, 2020
Zone on Nine, Album, 2017
"Combback," single, 2017
"Fading Out," single, 2017
"How Do You Find Yourself, Love?," double single, 2016
"As The Surface Rose," double single, 2016
Rift into The Secret Of Things, Album, 2013
"Felix," single, 2013
"Data Blockers," single, 2013
The Promise, EP, 2010 (as Nina Ferraro)
"Let It Go," single, 2009 (as Nina Ferraro)

References

External links 
Official website 
Facebook 
YouTube Channel 
Instagram
Bandcamp

1995 births
Living people
American women singer-songwriters
Musicians from Racine, Wisconsin
21st-century American women singers
21st-century American singers
Singer-songwriters from Wisconsin